The 2020–21 Deutsche Eishockey Liga season was the 27th season since the founding of the Deutsche Eishockey Liga. Due to the COVID-19 pandemic, the league announced 13 November 2020 as the start date, which was later postponed to a later date. On 19 November 2020, the DEL announced that the season would start on 17 December 2020.

Eisbären Berlin won their eighth title, after defeating the Grizzlys Wolfsburg in three games.

Format
The season saw the same 14 teams as last year, as all teams were given a license. Adler Mannheim will be the defending champions from the 2018–19 DEL season as the 2019–20 season was ended after the regular season. At that point, EHC Red Bull München, who won three consecutive DEL titles until Mannheim’s 2019 triumph (a 4–1 series win against Munich), were the league leaders and had clinched the first seed for the DEL playoffs.

This season would have marked the return of promotion and relegation, as the last placed team would have been relegated to the second tier DEL2 and the 2020–21 DEL2 champions would have replaced them for the 2021–22 season DEL. On 23 October 2020, the relegation rule was moved to next season. Still, the DEL2 champion can be promoted at the end of this season, so next season could be played with 15 teams. The 14 teams played the regular season in two groups (North and South). They played the teams from the same group four times and the teams from the other group twice. After that, the top four clubs from both groups advanced to the playoffs. The quarterfinals were played within the group before, from the semifinals on, it was mixed. All playoff rounds were best of three.

Teams

Regular season

North

Standings

Results

South

Standings

Results

Intra-groups games

Playoffs
All rounds were played in a best of three format. The first round was played in the regional group.

Bracket

Quarterfinals
The quarterfinals were played between 20 and 24 April 2021 in a best-of-three mode.

Eisbären Berlin vs Iserlohn Roosters

Fischtown Pinguins vs Grizzlys Wolfsburg

Adler Mannheim vs Straubing Tigers

EHC Red Bull München vs ERC Ingolstadt

Semifinals
The semifinals were played between 26 and 29 April 2021 in a best-of-three format.

Eisbären Berlin vs ERC Ingolstadt

Adler Mannheim vs Grizzlys Wolfsburg

Final
The final was played between 2 and 7 May 2021 in a best-of-three format.

Awards and statistics

Awards
The awards were announced on 2 May 2021.

Scoring leaders
List shows the top skaters sorted by points, then goals.

Leading goaltenders
Only the top five goaltenders, based on save percentage, who have played at least 40% of their team's minutes, are included in this list.

References

External links
Official website

2020–21
2020–21 in German ice hockey
DEL